Conversion or convert may refer to:

Arts, entertainment, and media
 "Conversion" (Doctor Who audio), an episode of the audio drama Cyberman
 "Conversion" (Stargate Atlantis), an episode of the television series
 "The Conversion" (The Outer Limits), a 1995 episode of the television series

Business and marketing
 Conversion funnel, the path a consumer takes through the web toward or near a desired action or conversion
 Conversion marketing, when a website's visitors take a desired action
 Converting timber to commercial lumber

Computing, science, and technology
 Conversion of units, conversion between different units of measurement

Computing and telecommunication
 CHS conversion of data storage, mapping cylinder/head/sector tuples to linear base address
 CPS conversion, in computer science, changing the form of continuation-passing
 Code conversion, in telecommunication, converting from one code to another
 convert (command), a command-line utility in the Windows NT operating system
 Convert, a command-line (graphics) image manipulation utility that is part of ImageMagick
 Data conversion, conversion of computer data from one format to another
 Transcoding, analog-to-analog or digital-to-digital conversion of one video encoding to another
 Type conversion, in computer science, changing the data type of a value into another data type

Other sciences
 Conversion (chemistry), the ratio of selectivity to yield or the change of a molecule
 Electric vehicle conversion, modification of a conventional vehicle to battery electric
 Energy conversion, the process of changing one form of energy to another
 Internal conversion, a radioactive decay process

Economics, finance, and property law
 Conversion (exchange), the rate at which one currency will be exchanged for another
 Conversion (law), a voluntary act by one person inconsistent with the ownership rights of another
 Conversion (options), an options-trading strategy in options arbitrage
 Economic conversion, a technical, economic and political process for moving from military to civilian markets
 Equitable conversion, a change in the nature of property so that real property is treated as personal property

Psychiatry
 Conversion disorder, a condition in which neurological symptoms arise without a definable organic cause
 Conversion therapy, a pseudo-scientific treatment to turn a homo- or bisexual person into a heterosexual person

Religion
 Religious conversion, the adoption of a new religious identity
 Deathbed conversion, a form of religious conversion 
 Forced conversion, forced adoption of a new religious identity 
 Marital conversion, a form of religious conversion 
 Secondary conversion, a form of religious conversion 
 Psychology of religious conversion, psychological aspect of religious conversion 
 Conversion to Buddhism, religious conversion to Buddhism
 Conversion to Christianity, religious conversion to Christianity
 Conversion of Paul the Apostle, personal conversion of Paul of Tarsus
 Conversion of Constantine, personal conversion of emperor Constantine
 Conversion to Catholicism, religious conversion to the Catholicism
 Conversion of non-Christian places of worship into churches, conversion into churches
 Conversion to Hinduism, religious conversion to Hinduism
 Conversion to Islam, religious conversion to Islam
 Safavid conversion of Iran to Shia Islam, conversion within Islam in Iran
 Conversion of non-Islamic places of worship into mosques, conversion into mosques
 Conversion to Judaism, religious conversion to Judaism
 Conversion of the Jews, religious conversion of the Jewish people
 History of Jewish conversion to Christianity, conversion of the Jews to Christianity

Sports
 Conversion (gridiron football), in American or Canadian football an opportunity to score an additional point following a touchdown
Two-point conversion, a gridiron football conversion to score two points
 Track and field athletics, an estimate of what a performance which has been measured in one system of measurements would have been if it had been measured in the other system
 Try#Conversion, in rugby, a kick at goal to convert a try into a larger set of points

Other uses
 Conversion (barn), conversion of old farming barns to commercial or residential use
 Conversion (logic), reversing the two parts of a categorical or implicational statement
 Conversion (word formation), the creation of a word from an existing word without any change in form
 Miniature conversion, altering the appearance of a miniature or model from the standard version

See also
 Converter (disambiguation)

 Translation (disambiguation)